Macropis is a genus of bees in the family Melittidae.

Description
Macropis species are of moderate size, not exceeding 15 mm. They have a livery predominantly black; males are characterized by conspicuous yellow markings on the head, but the females show morphological adaptations related to their foraging habits of flower oils, posterior tibiae with very developed, covered with a dense velvety hairs. Unlike most Melittidae, the wing has only two submarginal cells.

Biology
They are solitary bees that dig their nests in the ground. Most species are oligolectic and feed on pollen and floral oils of Lysimachia spp. They make a single generation per year. The males emerge from the ground in spring, just before the females, and await the females in the vicinity of the flowers of the host plant. After mating, the females dig a nest in the ground, ending with one or two rooms in which is collected the pollen, which is placed on the egg. The larvae, feeding on the pollen, develop rapidly, and within 10 days turn into pupae, spending the winter in this stage. Macropis nests are often parasitized by bee cleptoparasites such as Epeoloides.

Species
 Macropis ciliata Patton, 1880
 Macropis dimidiata Yasumatsu & Hirashima, 1956
 Macropis europaea Warncke, 1973
 Macropis frivaldszkyi Mocsáry, 1878
 Macropis fulvipes (Fabricius, 1804)
 Macropis hedini Alfken 1936
 Macropis immaculata Wu 1965
 Macropis kiangsuensis Wu, 1978
 Macropis micheneri Wu, 1992
 Macropis nuda (Provancher, 1882)
 Macropis omeiensis Wu, 1965
 Macropis orientalis Michez & Patiny, 2005
 Macropis patellata Patton, 1880
 Macropis steironematis Robertson, 1891
 Macropis tibialis Yasumatsu & Hirashima, 1956
 Macropis ussuriana (Popov, 1936)

References 

Bee genera
Melittidae